Ali "Naji" Badavi (born 20 June 1982) is an Iranian footballer who last played for the Sanat Naft in Azadegan League.

Club career
Badavi started his career at Foolad FC, however on his return from China after the 2004 Asian Cup, his troubles continued with Foolad FC and eventually left for city rival Esteghlal Ahvaz where he has yet to win a regular spot in the team.  Ali Badavi continued his excellent run for Esteghlal Ahvaz in the Iran Premier League (2005–2006) Season. His form was good enough for yet another recall for international duty.

Club career statistics
Last Update  24 May 2010 

 Assist Goals

International career
He made his debut for Iran national football team on 1 September 2002 versus Jordan.

He also played for the Iranian Olympic team during the 2002 Asian Games in Busan, and soon after became a player who was regularly called up to the national team.

During Iran's 2004 AFC Asian Cup game versus Oman, Badavi and Rezaei began physically fighting with each other in the middle of the game after a series of mistakes. Badavi was suspended for 2 games and returned in the semis versus China, where his last minute, close-range miss proved to be costly. The following season, he did not have good form and is rarely called up to the national team any more.

References

Iranian footballers
Association football defenders
Foolad FC players
Sanat Naft Abadan F.C. players
Esteghlal Ahvaz players
People from Ahvaz
1982 births
Living people
Iran international footballers
2004 AFC Asian Cup players
Iranian Arab sportspeople
Asian Games gold medalists for Iran
Asian Games medalists in football
Footballers at the 2002 Asian Games
Medalists at the 2002 Asian Games
Sportspeople from Khuzestan province
21st-century Iranian people